Mount Weininger is a large, mainly ice-free mountain in Antarctica, 1,970 m, standing at the north extremity of Mackin Table, to which it is joined by a short ridge, in the Patuxent Range, Pensacola Mountains. It was mapped by the United States Geological Survey (USGS) from surveys and U.S. Navy air photos from 1956 to 1966. It was named by the Advisory Committee on Antarctic Names (US-ACAN) for Richard B. Weininger, a scientific leader at South Pole Station during the winter of 1967.

Mountains of Queen Elizabeth Land
Pensacola Mountains